Filodes malgassalis is a moth in the family Crambidae. It was described by Paul Mabille in 1900. It is found on Madagascar.

References

Moths described in 1900
Spilomelinae
Moths of Madagascar